Petals was an Australian children's animated television programme produced and created by Mark Barnard and aired on the ABC. It ran from 1998 to 1999 consisting a total of one season and 30 episodes and was aimed at pre-school children aged 2–6. After it ended in 1999, the series was still continued to be repeated on the ABC and ABC1 until 23 January 2004.

Plot
The series revolves around five small petals who live in a large, overgrown garden. Bougie, Boronia, Poppy, Notsy and Imp greet each day in wide-eyed wonder as their explorations among the giant flowers and trees uncover surprises and delights. However the Petals are just small little people that you can't see but you can imagine them. They're also not fairies and don't have magical powers, but they're very athletic and only Bougie and Poppy are able to fly. Here they discover many surprises, delights and adventures such as helping a baby bird, picking berries, helping Imp turn a dripping tap off, playing a game of hide and seek, making bubbles with some soap, Imp rescuing Notsy with fireflies when she got lost, using a broken mirror to frighten Jeffrey and putting on a show to cheer up Worm when he had a kink in his tail. Joining them in their adventures were five other characters who were all insects. They were Cicada, Ant, Spider, Worm and Ladybird. There's also an orange playful cat named Jeffrey who likes to hang around in the garden and cause trouble for the Petals.

Characters

Petals

Bougie

Boronia

Imp

Poppy

Notsy

Animals and Insects

Cicada

Ant

Spider

Worm

Jeffrey

Episode list

Series 1
 A Boot Full of Petals
 Getting Dirty
 The Great Race
 The Baby Bird
 The Dripping Tap
 Firefly Rescue
 Poppy's Picnic
 Hide and Seek
 Car on the Hill
 Notsy's Knot
 Mr Exciting
 Sticky Scary Thing
 The Jeffrey Free Zone
 Notsy's Trail
 Berry Hunters
 A Turn for Worm
 Loop the Loop
 The Flying Imp
 Snow
 Water Works
 Broken Mirror
 Autumn
 Windy Weather
 Cry Wolf
 Sea-Slide
 Rainy Day Journey
 Bubbles
 Imp's Treasure
 Broken Wing
 The Lost Piano

Cast
 Anthony Warlow – Narrator
 Brian Meegan – Bougie
 Celia Ireland – Boronia
 Gabby Millgate – Poppy
 Adam Kronenberg – Imp
 Michelle Doake – Notsy
 Lucinda Armour – Spider / Ant
 Tim Mieville – Jeffrey / Worm / Cicada

Production
 The series was produced by the same producers as Bananas in Pyjamas at Catflap Animation Studios in Sydney. Catflap was launched and run by Maurice Giacomini (who also the director for the series) in 1988. Catflap has also made hundreds of television commercials, several animated short films, the character design for the 1995 animated film The Pied Piper of Hamelin and the animation for the American animated feature film All Dogs Go to Heaven 2 (which was a sequel to the first All Dogs Go to Heaven movie).
 Some of the episodes were written by Simon Hopkinson who has also written many episodes of Bananas in Pyjamas as well as other children's programmes such as New MacDonald's Farm, Dive Olly Dive!, Chuck Finn, Raggs and the animated feature film The Magic Pudding.
 It was one of the first children's fully 2D animated series created and produced for the ABC as well as being commissioned, funded and to have it aimed at pre-school children.
 Like several ABC shows such as Bananas in Pyjamas, The Adventures of Spot, Thomas the Tank Engine & Friends and Ferry Boat Fred it first aired at 3:55pm in the afternoons and at 9:25am in the mornings. However it was the final programme to air at 3:55pm, (the ABC's original afternoon timeslot) until 11 January 1999 where the afternoon schedules were now upgraded by having extra shows such as Play School now airing at 3:30pm and several half-hour, 5-minute short and 10-minute programmes airing at 4:00pm, although Petals continued airing at 9:25am in 2000.
The characters for the show come from the long tradition of fairies imagined at the bottom of the garden, and both the look and feel of the characters were based on plant species such as boronia, poppies and forget-me-nots.

International airings
 Petals has also been shown in several other countries including the United Kingdom, Slovakia, South Africa and Malaysia.

Video releases
Several episodes were released on video in 1998, however there has been no DVD release. There were three volumes in total and each of them contain ten episodes.

 Firefly Rescue and Other Stories – (100785) Released: 1998
Episodes include Firefly Rescue, A Boot Full of Petals, Mr. Exciting, The Flying Imp, The Dripping Tap, Notsy's Knot, Hide and Seek, The Jeffrey Free Zone, Loop the Loop and Getting Dirty

 Berry Hunters and Other Stories – (101760) Released: 1999
Episodes include Berry Hunters, Sticky Scary Thing, Snow, Water Works, Cry Wolf, Windy Weather, Poppy's Picnic, Sea-Slide, The Broken Mirror and Autumn

 The Great Race and Other Stories – (102206) Released: 1999
Episodes include The Great Race, A Turn for Worm, Rainy Day Journey, Car on the Hill, Broken Wing, The Baby Bird, Bubbles, Imp's Treasure, Notsy's Trail and The Lost Piano

The episode A Boot Full of Petals was also released on an ABC For Kids Club video in 1998 along with other ABC children's favourites including Bananas in Pyjamas, Hooley Dooleys, Mr Squiggle, Magic Mountain and Mister Whiskers.

Official website / Removal
 In 1999, the ABC later went on to launch a Petals website which contains all the characters, pictures of them, as well as some of their memorable sayings. The site also contains two online activity games which include a jigsaw puzzle and a colouring game, and also some pictures to print out and colour. Additional pictures of the series can also be seen on another print and colour page with other children's programmes from the ABC including Bananas in Pyjamas, Play School, Mixy and Magic Mountain. The online activity games were run by using Shockwave Player. They can also be seen on the Games Centre page with other online activity games featuring other ABC children's programmes. Such as Where's Mixy, Mix n' Match with Bananas in Pyjamas, the Play School Memory Game, the Spud Puzzle from Couch Potato, the Transylvania Slide from Feral TV, and a quiz game. The quiz game focuses on asking questions about different children's programmes and clicking on the correct answer. The show was also listed in the P section of the ABC programmes page, along with many other children's programmes from ABC TV. It includes a synopsis about the show and a screenshot of Imp and Notsy taken from "Firefly Rescue". The show's title is red, while the synopsis is in purple. However, both of them were removed during September 2010 when the new ABC For Kids website was introduced.
 A small video clip of the show can be found at the official ABC Commercial website.

Reboot
In 2013, ABC, Network Ten and China Central Television produced a new series distributed internationally by Daro Film Distribution, developed and produced with the assistance of Film Victoria, developed and financed with the assistance of Screen Australia and produced by Southern Star Entertainment.

References

1990s Australian animated television series
Australian children's animated television series
1998 Australian television series debuts
1999 Australian television series endings
Fictional fairies and sprites
Australian Broadcasting Corporation original programming
Australian preschool education television series
Animated preschool education television series
1990s preschool education television series
Animated television series about children